Sealy Township is one of the nine townships of Logan County, North Dakota, United States. It lies in the northwestern corner of the county and borders the following other townships within Logan County:
Glendale Township — east
Bryant Township — southeast corner

External links
Official map by the United States Census Bureau; Logan County listed on page 6

Townships in Logan County, North Dakota
Townships in North Dakota